The String Quartet No. 3 in D major, Op. 44, No. 1, was composed by Felix Mendelssohn(1809-1847) in July 1838 at the age of 29. It premiered in 1839, then was published later in 1840. It is a traditional quartet, comprising two violins, a viola, and a cello. The piece is part of the Op. 44 set of 3 string quartets that Mendelssohn dedicated to the Crown Prince of Sweden.

Movements 

Like all of Mendelssohn's string quartets, this work has four movements:

 Molto allegro vivace
 Menuetto: Un poco Allegretto
 Andante espressivo ma con moto
 Presto con brio

A typical performance lasts about 29-31 minutes.

References

External links 

String quartets by Felix Mendelssohn
1838 compositions
Compositions in D major